Harvest Moon: Light of Hope is a farm simulation role-playing game developed by Tabot, Inc. for multiple platforms. First announced at E3 2017, It was first released for Microsoft Windows on November 14, 2017, with versions for PlayStation 4 and Nintendo Switch following on May 29, 2018. It was later released for iOS and Android on September 26, 2018. A version containing all previously released downloadable content titled Harvest Moon: Light of Hope Complete was released for Windows 10 and Xbox One on September 18, 2020.

Gameplay 
The setting is in a harbor town, with the goal being to revive the lighthouse. As in most Harvest Moon games, players are able to grow crops and raise livestock. Additionally, the player is also able to get married, have a child, buy animals and help villagers with requests.

Reception

References

External links
Information by Steam Powered

2017 video games
Android (operating system) games
iOS games
Nintendo Switch games
PlayStation 4 games
Single-player video games
Story of Seasons games
Video games developed in Japan
Video games featuring protagonists of selectable gender
Video games scored by Tsukasa Tawada
Windows games
Xbox One games